The 1994 BC Lions finished in third place in the West Division with an 11–6–1 record. They won all of their playoff games and won the 82nd Grey Cup at home in Vancouver, British Columbia.

Offseason

CFL Draft

Preseason

Regular season

Season standings

Season schedule

Awards and records

1994 CFL All-Stars
 FB – Sean Millington, CFL All-Star
 CB – Less Browne, CFL All-Star
 DB – Charles Gordon, CFL All-Star

Western Division All-Star selections
 FB – Sean Millington, CFL Western All-Star
 SB – Darren Flutie, CFL Western All-Star
 WR – Ray Alexander, CFL Western All-Star
 OG – Rob Smith, CFL Western All-Star
 CB – Less Browne, CFL Western All-Star
 DB – Charles Gordon, CFL Western All-Star

Playoffs

West Semi-Final

West Final

Grey Cup

References

BC Lions seasons
N. J. Taylor Trophy championship seasons
Grey Cup championship seasons
BC Lions
1994 in British Columbia